Piz Surparé (3,078 m) is a mountain of the Oberhalbstein Alps, located west of Bivio in the canton of Graubünden. It is the highest point of the range between the Val Bercla and the lake of Marmorera.

References

External links
 Piz Surparé on Hikr

Mountains of Graubünden
Mountains of the Alps
Mountains of Switzerland
Alpine three-thousanders
Surses